John Cabot University (JCU) is a private American-style university in Rome, Italy. It was founded in 1972 and it offers undergraduate degrees, graduate degrees, and study abroad programs to English-speaking students. The university has more than 700 degree-seeking students and more than 1000 visiting students every year, representing over 80 nationalities. The average class size is fifteen students. The university consists of three campuses and two residence halls centrally located in Trastevere, Rome. The language of instruction is English.

History
The college was founded in 1972 and it was originally located within a religious school called Pro Deo University. It was named after 15th century Italian explorer Giovanni Caboto, also known as John Cabot, who opened the channels for further exploration of North America.

As of 1978, most students at John Cabot were business majors, though some were getting an Associate of Arts degree. From 1985 to 1991, the university expanded or created programs in Art History, International Affairs and English Literature. It was formerly academically associated with Hiram College in Hiram, Ohio. In 1991, the school became an independent university under the name John Cabot University and became accredited in 2003, thus endings its affiliation program with Hiram. The library moved, expanded, and was named after Frohring in 1999.

Academics 
John Cabot University is accredited by the Middle States Commission on Higher Education. It "follows the American system of education with a distinctive European character." The university offers associate and BA degrees in humanities subjects and in business administration.  Classes are taught in English. In Fall 2017, John Cabot University launched a Master of Arts in Art History. The Guarini Institute for Public Affairs provides lectures and events on world political and human rights themes.

The Frank J. Guarini School of Business is accredited by the Association to Advance Collegiate Schools of Business (AACSB).

Undergraduate programs 

The university has 9 academic departments:

 Department of Art History and Studio Art
 Department of Business Administration
 Department of Communications
 Department of Economics and Social Sciences
 Department of English Language and Literature
 Department of History and Humanities
 Department of Mathematics, Natural, and Applied Sciences
 Department of Modern Languages and Literature
 Department of Political Science and International Affairs

Graduate program 
John Cabot University's Masters in Arts (MA) in Art History is based in Rome. There is an emphasis on first-hand research among the museums, monuments, and archeological sites of Rome.

Campus 

The university has three campuses located in the Trastevere neighborhood of central Rome: the Frank J. Guarini Campus, the Tiber Campus, and the Caroline Critelli Guarini Campus on the banks of the Tiber River. The three locations are about five minutes from each other and near both the Vatican and the Roman Forum. The Frank J. Guarini campus is a former convent with a main three-story building surrounded by terraces and courtyards. The prior chapel now serves as a student lounge.

There is also a computer lab, student housing buildings, and the Frohring library. The largest building on-campus is the Aula Magna Regina auditorium. Some classes are held at the Sacchetti Building on the other side of the Tiber River and many art classes are conducted at monuments or at other notable landmarks.

A student dormitory, the Gianicolo Residence is located two minutes away from the main Guarini campus, but the university also offers off-campus dormitories on Viale di Trastevere and external apartments around the area.

Athletics 
JCU offers intramural basketball, dodgeball, beach volleyball, five-a-side soccer, tennis, paddle, and footgolf. The Fitness Center is located inside the Gianicolo Residence Hall. The club team sports consist of men's soccer, men and women's futsal, coed volleyball, coed basketball, and cheerleading. The university's team name is the Gladiators.

Student demographics 
About 66% of students are female. Students come from more than 70 countries, often in study abroad programs. 

The student to teacher ratio is 15:1.

References

Universities in Italy
Universities and colleges in Rome
Educational institutions established in 1972
1972 establishments in Italy